The Victorian Emergency Management Training Centre (VEMTC) is a training facility for volunteer and career emergency services personnel. It used by Fire Rescue Victoria, the Country Fire Authority (CFA), Victoria Police, Ambulance Victoria, Victoria State Emergency Service and the Department of Environment, and Primary Industries. The center is located in Melbourne, Australia's north in Craigieburn.

History

2014 
The training center was completed in June 2014 for $109 million and designed by Woods Bagot and HAAGEN.
It was built for Melbourne Fire Brigade (MFB) after 2 years of planning.

2015 
It is the primary training center for Melbourne Fire Brigade (MFB) and their recruiting courses and promotional courses are run from VEMTC.

Following the closure of CFA Fiskville training ground due to health and safety reasons, the VEMTC became the primary training facility for CFA new career fire fighters.

Key features 
The 10 hectare facility has a focus on urban emergency incidents with scenarios for the following settings:
 road
 rail
 tunnel
 marine
 Urban Search and Rescue (USAR)
 High Angle Rescue Team (HART)
There is a large seven-story building or prop which includes a carpark and numerous other types of environments including an atrium, prison and hospital themes.

References

Fire and rescue services of Victoria (Australia)
Training organizations
Organizations established in 2014
Buildings and structures in the City of Hume